HD 117618 b, named Noifasui by the IAU, is an exoplanet discovered orbiting the star HD 117618 in September 2004. The planet is a small gas giant less than a fifth the mass of Jupiter. It orbits close to its star in a very eccentric orbit.

Name 
The planet was originally named "HD 117618 b", being the second object in the HD 117618 system. It was given the name "Noifasui" by the IAU, chosen by Indonesian representatives for the NameExoWorlds campaign, meaning revolve around in Nias language (derived from the word ifasui, meaning to revolve around, and no, indicating that the action occurred in the past and continued to the present time). Its parent star was simultaneously named "Döfida" in the contest.

References

External links 
 
 California & Carnegie Planet Search entry

Exoplanets discovered in 2004
Giant planets
Centaurus (constellation)
Exoplanets detected by radial velocity
Exoplanets with proper names